Kwon Kyung-Ho (born July 12, 1986) is a South Korean football player who, as of 2010 is playing for Korea National League side Goyang Kookmin Bank. His previous club is Gangwon FC.

On November 18, 2008, he was one of sixteen priority members to join Gangwon FC. He made his debut for Gangwon against Daegu FC on April 8, 2009 in league cup match. His first league match was against Seongnam by substitute on 21 June 2009. From 2010 season, he joined Korea National League side Goyang Kookmin Bank.

Club career statistics

References

External links
 K-League Player Record 

1986 births
Living people
South Korean footballers
Gangwon FC players
K League 1 players
Association football midfielders